Sylvie Vermeillet is a French politician and a member of the Franche-Comté Regional Council. She represents the Jura department and is a member of the Union for a Popular Movement Party.

Opposition leader in Franche-Comté regional council 

On 24 October 2009 she replaced Jean-François Humbert as Leader of UMP Group in Regional Council. After the regional elections, Joyandet succeeded him as head of the opposition group.

On 9 July 2010 Alain Joyandet left the regional council; Vermeillet succeeded him again.

References

External links 
Page on the Association des régions de France
Page on Franche-Comté Regional Council

1967 births
Living people
Union for a Popular Movement politicians
Radical Party (France) politicians
Radical Movement politicians
French Senators of the Fifth Republic
Senators of Jura (department)
Franche-Comté Regional Councillors
Women in Franche-Comté politics
21st-century French women politicians
Women members of the Senate (France)